Nicholas Kendall (c. 1577–1643) was an English politician who sat in the House of Commons  in 1625 and 1640. He was killed in action fighting on the Royalist side in the English Civil War.

Kendall was the son of  Walter Kendall of Pelyn, Cornwall. He matriculated at Exeter College, Oxford in October 1594  aged 17. He became recorder of Lostwithiel.  

In 1625, Kendall was elected Member of Parliament for Lostwithiel in a double return. He was elected again as MP for Lostwithiel in April 1640 for the Short Parliament. 
 
Kendall became a colonel in the King's army. He led a troop of Royalist soldiers into Bodmin, where they routed the Parliamentarian troopers who were raiding the town. He was killed at the siege of Bristol in 1643. He was buried in Lanlivery Church.

Kendall married  by Emlyn Treffrey, daughter of Thomas Treffrey of Lostwithiel. Their son Walter  was also MP for Lostwithiel.

References

 

1570s births
1643 deaths
Alumni of Exeter College, Oxford
Members of the pre-1707 English Parliament for constituencies in Cornwall
English MPs 1640 (April)
16th-century English people
Year of birth uncertain
Cavaliers
English military personnel killed in action
People from Lostwithiel
People killed in the English Civil War